The Dry Hills are a mountain range in Eureka County, Nevada.

References 

Mountain ranges of Nevada
Mountain ranges of the Great Basin
Mountain ranges of Eureka County, Nevada